Route 326, or Highway 326, may refer to:

Canada
 Nova Scotia Route 326

China
 China National Highway 326

Costa Rica
 National Route 326

Japan
 Japan National Route 326

United States
  Interstate 326 (former)
  Arkansas Highway 326
 Florida:
  Florida State Road 326
  County Road 326 (Levy County, Florida)
  County Road 326 (Marion County, Florida)
  Georgia State Route 326
  Kentucky Route 326
  Louisiana Highway 326
  Maryland Route 326
  Minnesota State Highway 326 (former)
  Montana Secondary Highway 326
 Montana Secondary Highway 326 (former)
  New York State Route 326
  Ohio State Route 326
  Pennsylvania Route 326
  Puerto Rico Highway 326
  Tennessee State Route 326
 Texas:
  Texas State Highway 326
  Texas State Highway Spur 326
  Farm to Market Road 326
  Virginia State Route 326